Karandyshevo is a rural locality (a village) in Krasnoselskoye Rural Settlement, Yuryev-Polsky District, Vladimir Oblast, Russia. The population was 42 as of 2010. There are 7 streets.

Geography 
Karandyshevo is located 27 km southeast of Yuryev-Polsky (the district's administrative centre) by road. Avdotyino is the nearest rural locality.

References 

Rural localities in Yuryev-Polsky District